Hydroperoxides or peroxols are compounds containing the hydroperoxide functional group (ROOH). If the R is organic, the compounds are called organic hydroperoxides.  Such compounds are a subset of organic peroxides, which have the formula ROOR. Organic hydroperoxides can either intentionally or unintentionally initiate explosive polymerisation in materials with unsaturated chemical bonds.

Properties
The O−O bond length in peroxides is about 1.45 Å, and the R−O−O angles (R = H, C) are about 110° (water-like). Characteristically, the C−O−O−H dihedral angles are about 120°.

Hydroperoxides are typically more volatile than the corresponding alcohols:
 tert-BuOOH (b.p. 36°C) vs tert-BuOH (b.p. 82-83°C)
 CH3OOH (b.p. 46°C) vs CH3OH (b.p. 65°C
 cumene hydroperoxide (b.p. 153°C) vs cumyl alcohol (b.p. 202°C)

Miscellaneous reactions
Hydroperoxides are mildly acidic.  The range is indicated by 11.5 for CH3OOH to 13.1 for Ph3COOH.

Hydroperoxides can be reduced to alcohols with lithium aluminium hydride, as described in this idealized equation:
4 ROOH  +  LiAlH4  →   LiAlO2  +  2 H2O  +  4 ROH
This reaction is the basis of methods for analysis of organic peroxides. Another way to evaluate the content of peracids and peroxides is the volumetric titration with alkoxides such as sodium ethoxide.
The phosphite esters and tertiary phosphines also effect reduction:
ROOH  +  PR3  →   OPR3  +  ROH

Uses

Precursors to epoxides
"The single most important synthetic application of alkyl hydroperoxides is without doubt the metal-catalysed epoxidation of alkenes." In the Halcon process tert-butyl hydroperoxide (TBHP) is employed for the production of propylene oxide.

Of specialized interest, chiral epoxides are prepared using hydroperoxides as reagents in the Sharpless epoxidation.

Production of cyclohexanone and caprolactone
Hydroperoxides are intermediates in the production of many organic compounds in industry.  For example, the cobalt catalyzed oxidation of cyclohexane to cyclohexanone:
C6H12  +  O2   →   (CH2)5CO  +   H2O

Drying oils, as found in many paints and varnishes, function via the formation of hydroperoxides.

Hock processes

Compounds with allylic and benzylic C−H bonds are especially susceptible to oxygenation.  Such reactivity is exploited industrially on a large scale for the production of phenol by the Cumene process or Hock process for its cumene and cumene hydroperoxide intermediates. Such reactions rely on radical initiators that reacts with oxygen to form an intermediate that abstracts a hydrogen atom from a weak C-H bond. The resulting radical binds O2, to give hydroperoxyl (ROO.), which then continues the cycle of H-atom abstraction.

Formation

By autoxidation
The most important (in a commercial sense) peroxides are produced by autoxidation, the direct reaction of O2 with a hydrocarbon.  Autoxidation is a radical reaction that begins with the abstraction of an H atom from a relatively weak C-H bond.  Important compounds made in this way include tert-butyl hydroperoxide, cumene hydroperoxide and ethylbenzene hydroperoxide:
R-H  +  O2  →  ROOH

Auto-oxidation reaction is also observed with common ethers, such as diethyl ether, diisopropyl ether, tetrahydrofuran, and 1,4-dioxane. An illustrative product is diethyl ether peroxide. Such compounds can result in a serious explosion when distilled.
To minimize this problem, commercial samples of THF are often inhibited with butylated hydroxytoluene (BHT). Distillation of THF to dryness is avoided because the explosive peroxides concentrate in the residue.

Although ether hydroperoxide often form adventitiously (i.e. autoxidation), they can be prepared in high yield by the acid-catalyzed addition of hydrogen peroxide to vinyl ethers:
C2H5OCH=CH2  +  H2O2  →  C2H5OCH(OOH)CH3

From hydrogen peroxide
Many industrial peroxides are produced using hydrogen peroxide.  Reactions with aldehydes and ketones yield a series of compounds depending on conditions.  Specific reactions include addition of hydrogen peroxide across the C=O double bond:
R2C=O  +  H2O2  →  R2C(OH)OOH
In some cases, these hydroperoxides convert to give cyclic diperoxides:
[R2C(O2H)]2O2   →  [R2C]2(O2)2  +   2 H2O
Addition of this initial adduct to a second equivalent of the carbonyl:
R2C=O  +  R2C(OH)OOH  →  [R2C(OH)]2O2
Further replacement of alcohol groups:
[R2C(OH)]2O2  +  2 H2O2  →  [R2C(O2H)]2O2  +   2 H2O

Triphenylmethanol reacts with hydrogen peroxide gives the unusually stable hydroperoxide, Ph3COOH.

Naturally occurring hydroperoxides
Many hydroperoxides are derived from fatty acids, steroids, and terpenes.  The biosynthesis of these species is affected extensively by enzymes.

References

 
Organic compounds
Food additives
Functional groups